Newman's Own is an American food company headquartered in Connecticut. Founded in 1982 by actor Paul Newman and author A. E. Hotchner, the company donates all of its after-tax profits to charity through the Newman's Own Foundation, a private nonprofit foundation which in turn supports various educational and charitable organizations.

History
The brand started in 1982 with a homemade salad dressing that Paul Newman and A. E. Hotchner prepared themselves and gave to friends as gifts. The successful reception of the salad dressing led Newman and Hotchner to commercialize it for sale, financing it with $20,000 each as seed money. Afterward, they also produced pasta sauce, frozen pizza, lemonade, fruit cocktail juices, popcorn, salsa, grape juice, and other products. Newman's Own Lemonade was introduced in 2004 and Newman's Own premium wines in 2008. Each label features a picture of Newman, dressed in a different costume to represent the product.  The company incorporated humor into its label packaging, as in the label for its first salad dressing in 1982, "Fine Foods Since February". Many of the stories on the food labels were made up.

In 1993, Newman's daughter Nell Newman founded Newman's Own Organics as a division of the company, later to become a separate company in late 2001. It produces organic foods, including chocolate, cookies, pretzels and pet food. Her father posed with her for the photographs on the labels. In 2014, Nell's license with Newman's Own was not renewed, and Newman's Own Organics was transferred back to Newman's Own.

Newman and Hotchner co-wrote a memoir about their company and the Hole in the Wall Gang Camps, Shameless Exploitation in Pursuit of the Common Good, published in 2003.  Newman and CEO Robert Forrester arranged for the continuation of the distribution of Newman's Own profits to charity after Newman's death through the establishment of the Newman's Own Foundation.

Following Newman's death in 2008, control of the company and foundation passed to CEO Robert Forrester. Since taking over, Forrester expanded and diversified the company. Newman's daughter, Susan, has alleged that Forrester had taken her family "hostage" and pushed them off the board of the Newman's Own Foundation, the body set up to distribute company profits to charitable causes. Forrester said that the company and foundation are continuing to be operated in accordance with the late Paul Newman's expressed wishes. Forrester's salary increased from $185,000 to $295,000 from 2010 to 2013. Forrester was fired in 2019 as a result of an internal review following allegations of inappropriate behavior, and the board appointed Jennifer Smith Turner as interim president and CEO. In January 2020, Dr. Miriam Nelson took over those roles, and the board finalized the positions in January 2021.

Charitable funding and beneficiaries
According to the Newman's Own Foundation website, over $550 million has been generated for charity since 1982. In 2016 the company donated profits of $30 million after gross sales of $600 million. The company co-sponsored the PEN/Newman's Own First Amendment Award, which was presented annually to a United States resident who had fought courageously, despite adversity, to safeguard the First Amendment right to freedom of expression as it applied to the written word.

A sampling of grantees is available at the Newman's Own Foundation website along with a description of funding areas.  One beneficiary of this charity is the SeriousFun Children's Network (previously the Association of Hole in the Wall Camps), residential summer camps for seriously ill children, which Newman co-founded in 1988. Today, there are camps, programs, and initiatives operating in 50 countries across 5 continents. Over 384,700 children have attended a SeriousFun program free of charge.  While proceeds from Newman's Own financed the startup of the camp, it now receives funding from many other sources.  Additionally, the Newman's Own Foundation also provided a grant to The MINDS Foundation to fund US operations of the non-profit that works in rural India. Other beneficiaries of the profits from Newman's Own have included The New York Times Neediest Cases Fund (from 1983 onwards), Shining Hope for Communities, Safe Water Network, Edible Schoolyard NYC, Fisher House Foundation, the WILD Young Women Programme (New Zealand), and Pilgrims Hospices (UK).

References

Further reading

External links

Newman's Own Foundation

Food manufacturers of the United States
Food and drink companies established in 1982
Salad dressings
Social enterprises
Food and drink companies based in Connecticut
Companies based in Westport, Connecticut
1982 establishments in Connecticut
Condiment companies of the United States
Privately held companies based in Connecticut